Dictenidia is a genus of true crane flies.

Species
D. bimaculata (Linnaeus, 1760)
D. formosana Alexander, 1920
D. glabrata Alexander, 1938
D. inaequipectinata Alexander, 1934
D. knutsoni Yang & Yang, 1989
D. luteicostalis Alexander, 1936
D. manipurana (Alexander, 1970)
D. miyatakei Alexander, 1953
D. partialis Yang & Yang, 1989
D. pictipennis (Portschinsky, 1887)
D. rhadinoclada (Alexander, 1970)
D. sauteri Enderlein, 1921
D. sichuanensis Yang & Yang, 1989
D. stalactitica Alexander, 1941
D. subpartialis Yang & Yang, 1989

References

Tipulidae
Tipuloidea genera